Carol M. Meyrowitz is the Executive Chairman of the Board and the Chairman of the Executive Committee of TJX Companies, the leading off-price retailer in the United States. As of 2015, she is listed as the 76th most powerful woman in the world by Forbes. As of 2014, she was also ranked as the 12th most powerful woman in the world by Fortune.

Biography
Born to a Jewish family, Meyrowitz graduated from Rider University with a bachelor's in marketing and management. She serves as a director of Amscan Holdings Inc. and Staples Inc. She's a member of The Boston Club's corporate advisory board, the board of governors for The Chief Executives' Club of Boston and the board of overseers for the Joslin Diabetes Center.

History with TJX
Meyrowitz joined TJX Companies in 1983. In 2001, she became Executive Vice President of the company, as well as the President of Marmaxx, the largest division of the company. She rose to Senior Executive Vice President in March 2004, which she maintained until January 2005. In January 2005, she left her positions and became an advisor for TJX and Berkshire Partners. Her plan was to leave the advisory role in September of that year to "pursue new opportunities and challenges" outside of TJX.

However, Meyrowitz became president on October 17, 2005; additionally, she became a member of the board of directors on September 7, 2006. She was appointed Chief Executive Officer of the company on January 28, 2007, replacing acting CEO Bernard Cammarata, the Chairman of the Board for TJX.

In January 2016 she was replaced as Chief Executive Officer of TJX by Ernie Herrman.

Media recognition
She ranked 26th on CNN's 50 Most Powerful Women in Business 2006. In 2009, Forbes ranked her 24th in their list of the 100 Most Powerful Women. As of 2014, she is listed as the 76th most powerful woman in the world by Forbes.

See also
 Zayre

References

External links
 Reuters.com Brief biography of Carol Meyrowitz

American women chief executives
American Jews
Living people
American retail chief executives
Rider University alumni
20th-century American businesspeople
20th-century American businesswomen
21st-century American businesspeople
American corporate directors
Women corporate directors
Year of birth missing (living people)
21st-century American businesswomen